Ekemblemaria is a genus of chaenopsid blennies found in the eastern Pacific and western Atlantic oceans.

Species
There are currently three recognized species in this genus:
 Ekemblemaria lira Hastings, 1992
 Ekemblemaria myersi J. S. Stephens, 1963 (Reefsand blenny)
 Ekemblemaria nigra (Meek & Hildebrand, 1928) (Moth blenny)

References

 
Chaenopsidae